GoMart Ballpark is the current home field for the Charleston Dirty Birds, a baseball team in the Atlantic League of Professional Baseball.  It also has been used by the baseball programs of West Virginia University, Marshall University,  and the University of Charleston. The stadium, which opened in April 2005, is located in the East End of Charleston, West Virginia. It seats 4,500 fans and cost $25 million to build. The dimensions of the field are as follows: left field - 330 feet, center field - 400 feet, right field - 320 feet.

History
Additionally, the park hosts the West Virginia state high school baseball championships. From 2006 to 2018, it was the home field for Marshall's Conference USA games, as Marshall did not have an adequate baseball facility on its campus located 50 miles (80 km) away in Huntington.  For the 2019 season, temporary upgrades allowed the school to play most games at home, excepting games versus West Virginia and Virginia Tech, which generally draw a larger crowd than the Huntington facility can accommodate.  The school is fundraising for a baseball facility on campus.  When West Virginia University moved from the Big East Conference to the Big 12 Conference, its on-campus baseball field likewise did not meet league standards, and WVU played its conference games in Charleston until a new taxpayer funded stadium was built on campus.

The stadium has also hosted concerts, boxing matches, charity events and shown television coverage of college football games on its scoreboard.

The naming rights were initially purchased by Appalachian Power, the West Virginia and southwest Virginia operating unit of American Electric Power. In November 2022, the stadium was renamed GoMart Ballpark after local convenience chain GoMart purchased the naming rights.

In the ballpark's inaugural season, a Charleston baseball record 10,400 fans showed up on "Buck Night", which is a promotional night held on Thursdays where hot dogs, fountain drinks, and beer is $1.

In 2008, parts of The World's Strongest Man competition were held at the stadium.

In 2009, the South Atlantic League's 50th All-Star game was held at the stadium along with a home run derby, won by Calvin Anderson, and a fan fest.

In 2012, Stadium Journey Magazine named GoMart Ballpark among the ten best minor league baseball parks in the nation, and number 58 in its list of 100 best athletic venues worldwide.

TNA Wrestling held BaseBrawl Wrestling events at the stadium on September 8, 2012.

Stadium features
For the 2023 baseball season, the grass stadium surface was replaced with synthetic turf.

The ballpark features an authentic locomotive horn donated by Norfolk Southern Corporation, whose tracks run adjacent to the park, coincidentally continuing the atmosphere of predecessor Watt Powell Park. The horn was refurbished in 2005 by employees of Norfolk Southern's Juniata Locomotive Shop in Altoona, Pennsylvania at the request of Assistant Division Superintendent Joe Maynard of Williamson.

One unique feature of the park is an electrical outlet located in the backstop behind home plate. This was added to accommodate local politician Rod Blackstone, nicknamed the "Toast Man," who has become one of the most famous fans in minor league baseball. Blackstone brings numerous signs to urge the team on, and regularly leads the crowd in family-friendly cheers. He is most famous for bringing bread and a toaster to games, which he had done for years for the Power's predecessors. When a Power pitcher strikes out a batter, he yells "You are toast!" and then tosses slices of fresh (and not-so-fresh) toast into the seats around him, following it up with a chant of "Don't eat the toast. You don't know where it's been."

The section behind the opposing team dugout is known as "Rowdy Alley" where Billy Bob and the Rowdys deliver family-friendly, good-natured heckles to the opposing team players and coaches as well to the umpires when they make bad calls.  Billy Bob and Rowdy Alley are carryovers from Watt Powell Park and they have been razzing the opposing team since the early Charleston Alley Cats days. A night doesn't go by without hearing what can only be described as a Billy Bob Cackle when an opposing player strikes out.  Choruses of "DIRT BALL!" and "BORING!" (sometimes in both English AND Spanish) pepper the opposing pitchers, and opposing coaches who dare venture onto the field are met with "LEFT-RIGHT-LEFT-RIGHT" all the way to the mound and back.  The Rowdys are also known for their use of props to amuse the fans: duck-shaped umbrellas pop-up with loud calls of "DUCK!" when foul balls ricochet overhead, costume accessories, and noise-makers are abundant.

The stadium previously housed a seasonal and special events restaurant called the "Power Alley Bar and Grill" that featured food, indoor and outside seating, a full size bar, and pictures and memorabilia from Watt Powell Park and famous former players. In 2013, the restaurant was closed and reopened by a private vendor. The current restaurant is not sports-themed and does not have direct ties to the stadium.

In 2007, a party deck was built near the right field foul pole that can accommodate 250 people. An upgrade to a normal game ticket can be purchased for $25, allowing access to the Party Deck, which features all-you-can-eat hot dogs, nachos and other "baseball food," as well as unlimited drinks.  Naming rights for the party deck were recently acquired by Anheuser-Busch. In the 2008 and 2009 seasons, this area was known as the "Landshark Lagoon" but has since been renamed the "Budweiser Party Deck."

Also in 2007, the Charleston Baseball Wall of Fame made its debut, located behind the home plate press box. "Wheeler" Bob (longtime Wheelers/Alley Cats/Power program & souvenir merchant), Rod "Toast Man" Blackstone, and Dave Parker are just three of the few who've had the honor of being inducted onto the Wall.

See also
 List of NCAA Division I baseball venues

References

External links
Official stadium website
Review at baseballparks.com
Appalachian Power Park Views - Ball Parks of the Minor Leagues

Buildings and structures in Charleston, West Virginia
Baseball venues in West Virginia
College baseball venues in the United States
Marshall Thundering Herd baseball
Minor league baseball venues
High school baseball venues in the United States
Sports venues in West Virginia
Tourist attractions in Kanawha County, West Virginia
West Virginia Mountaineers baseball 
Sports venues completed in 2005
2005 establishments in West Virginia